The Tehran Conference was a meeting of the three main Allied leaders during World War II. 

Tehran Conference may also refer to: 

 International Conference to Review the Global Vision of the Holocaust in Tehran in 2006 
 Tehran International Conference on Disarmament and Non-Proliferation, 2010